Enteromius walkeri is a species of ray-finned fish in the genus Enteromius from Ghana and the Ivory Coast where it is threatened by pollution and other activities around mining.

References 

 

Enteromius
Fish described in 1904
Taxa named by George Albert Boulenger